Miomantis kilimandjarica is a species of praying mantis in the family Miomantidae, native to Africa  where it is found on Mount Kilimanjaro in Tanzania.

See also
List of mantis genera and species

References

K
Mantodea of Africa
Insects of Tanzania